Free Media Awards (formerly: Gerd Bucerius Prize for Free Press in Eastern Europe) is the press prizes awarded by the two foundations The Fritt Ord Foundation and the ZEIT-Stiftung.

History and prize consideration 
The prize was launched in 2000 by the ZEIT Foundation and was called the Gerd Bucerius Press Prizes for Eastern Europe. The prize is named after the German politician and journalist Gerd Bucerius. In 2004, after the ZEIT Foundation began cooperation with the organisation Freedom of Expression Foundation (Fritt Ord), the prize was presented jointly.

The prize is awarded to journalists and media in Eastern Europe, who are distinguished by their quality, professionalism and civil courage. Organisations consider nominations after consultation with external experts. Each year, an independent jury selects the winners based on these nominations. Three to five awards are awarded per year.

Jury 

 Alice Bota — Polish-German journalist and writer
 Ane Tusvik Bonde — Norwegian senior advisor at the Human Rights House Foundation
 Juri Durkot — Ukrainian journalist and translator
  — Norwegian journalist, NRK correspondent
 Martin Paulsen — Eastern Europe expert from the University of Bergen
 Silvia Stöber — German journalist specialising on Eastern Europe, South Caucasus and Central Asia

Laureates

2000 

 Brestskiy Kurier — Belarusian newspaper
  — Russian newspaper in the German language
 Veidas — Lithuanian news magazine
  — Russian journalist based in Moscow

2001 

 Zerkalo Nedeli — Ukrainian newspaper
 Asya Tretyuk — Belarusian journalist
 Belorusskaya Delovaya Gazeta — Belarusian newspaper
  — Russian newspaper

2002 

 Novaya Gazeta — Russian newspaper
 Vysoky Zamok — Ukrainian newspaper
 Narodnaja Volya — Belarusian newspaper
  — Bulgarian newspaper
 Cristian Tudor Popescu — Romanian journalist

2003 

  — Russian newspaper
 Ekspres — Ukrainian newspaper
 Belorusy i rynok (back in 2003 called "Belorusskiy Rynok" ) — Belarusian newspaper
 Mikola Markevich — Belarusian journalist

2004 

  — Russian newspaper
  — Russian newspaper
  — Ukrainian newspaper
 Intex-Press — Belarusian newspaper
 24 saati — Georgian newspaper
 Yulia Latynina — Russian journalist and writer
 Svetlana Kalinkina — Belarusian journalist

2005 

 The New Times — Russian magazine
 Chechenskoye obshchestvo — Russian newspaper
 BelaPAN — Belarusian news agency
 Vitebskiy Kurier — Belarusian newspaper
 Resonansi — Georgian newspaper
 Semyon Novoprudsky — Russian journalist

2006 

  — Belarusian newspaper
 Russian-Chechen news agency — Russian news agency (now Finland-based)
 Sovetskaya Kalmykiya segodnya — Russian newspaper
 Vyborgskie Vedomosti — Russian newspaper
 Fatima Tlisova — Russian journalist of Circassian origin
 Veronika Shahova — Russian journalist
 Ukrayinska Pravda — Ukrainian newspaper

2007 

 Natalia Novozhilova — Russian journalist
 Inform Polis — Russian newspaper
 Caucasian Knot — Russian news portal
 TURAN — Azerbaijani news agency
 Nasha Niva — Belarusian newspaper
 CDMAG or CDMag — Belarusian media project

2008 

 The New Times — Russian magazine
 Moy gorod bez tsenzury — Russian weekly newspaper
 Victoria Ivleva — Russian photojournalist and correspondent
 Elena Larionova — Russian journalist
 Hazeta Slonimskaya — Belarusian newspaper
 Yezhednevnik — Belarusian online portal
 Rauf Mirgadirov — Azerbaijani journalist

2009 

 Roman Shleinov — Russian journalist of the newspaper Novaya Gazeta
 Zoya Svetova — Russian journalist based in Moscow
 Novy Chas — newspaper of the city of Minsk, Belarus
 Batumelebi — Georgian weekly newspaper
 Marianna Grigoryan — freelance Armenian journalist
 Azadliq — Azerbaijani daily newspaper
 Natik Javadli — journalist of the newspaper

2010 

 Mikhail Beketov — journalist of the newspaper Khimkinskaya Pravda
 Arsenyevskiye Vesti — the newspaper of the city of Vladivostok, Russia
 Borisovskie novosti — newspaper of the city of Barysaw, Belarus
 Liberali — Georgian magazine
  — Azerbaijani journalist
  — Azerbaijani network television
 Edik Baghdasaryan — Armenian journalist

2011 

 Chernovik — Dagestan weekly newspaper
 Natalya Ivanishina — journalist of the newspaper Ust-Ilimskaya Pravda
 Marina Koktysh — journalist of the newspaper Narodnaya Volya
  — journalist of the Internet media 
  — Azerbaijani journalist
 A1plus — Armenian news portal

2012 

 Olga Romanova — blogger on Echo of Moscow and columnist for The New Times
  magazine — Caucasian independent magazine
  — editor-in-chief of the Gramadzyanskaya Alternative magazine and leading columnist for the Svobodnye novosti plus newspaper
 The Ukrainian Week magazine
 Khadija Ismayilova — Azerbaijani journalist

2013 

 Elena Kostyuchenko — special correspondent of the information department of Novaya Gazeta
  — chief editor of the  online portal
  — socio-political weekly newspaper
 Serhiy Leshchenko — Ukrainian political journalist
  — Azerbaijani journalist
 Mehman Huseynov — Azerbaijani journalist

2014 

  — Russian journalist
 Dozhd — Russian independent TV channel
 Tetiana Chornovol — Ukrainian journalist
  — Ukrainian journalist
 Mustafa Nayyem — Ukrainian journalist
 Alexander Klaskovsky — Belarusian journalist
 Objective TV — Azerbaijani internet channel
 Epress.am — Armenian news portal

2015 

 Netgazeti — Georgian news portal
  — Ukrainian journalist and editor-in-chief of the online newspaper Ostro V
  — Ukrainian news agency
  — Ukrainian journalist
  — Russian regional socio-political newspaper
 Galina Timchenko — Russian journalist, editor-in-chief and the founder of the Meduza newspaper

2016 

  (Our Money) — Ukrainian website
 Elena Milashina — Russian journalist
 Seymur Hazi — Azerbaijani editor and commentator

2017 

  — Russian caricature artist
  — Russian journalist
 Zaruhi Mejlumyan — Armenian journalist
 Meydan TV — Azerbaijani media organisation

2018 

 Belarusian Partisan — Belarusian newspaper
  — Russian newspaper
 Chai Khana — Georgian media platform

2019 

 The Insider — Russian online newspaper
  — Ukrainian magazine
 Hafiz Babali — Azerbaijani journalist
 CivilNet — Armenian media platform
 7x7 — Russian regional online newspaper and blog

2020 
 MediaZona — Russian media outlet
 Proekt — Russian media outlet
 Aziz Karimov — Azerbaijani journalist
 Stanislav Aseyev — Ukrainian journalist
 Schemes — broadcast on Ukrainian television

2021 
 Katsiaryna Barysevich – Belarusian journalist of TUT.BY
 Katsyaryna Andreeva – Belarusian journalist of Belsat TV
 Darya Chultsova – Belarusian journalist of Belsat TV
 Natallia Lubneuskaya  – Belarusian journalist of Nasha Niva
 TUT.BY – Belarusian media outlet
 Belarusian Association of Journalists

2022 
 Mstyslav Chernov - Ukrainian photographer
 Yevgeniy Maloletka - Ukrainian photographer 
 Nataliya Gumenyuk - Ukrainian journalist and author
 Andriy Dubchak - Ukrainian photo and video reporter
 Vladyslav Yesypenko - Ukrainian journalist and political prisoner on Russian-occupied Crimea
 Zaborona - Ukrainian online newspaper

References 

Arts awards in Germany
Human rights awards
Russian awards
Journalism awards